Alameda County is a county located in the U.S. state of California. As of the 2020 census, the population was 1,682,353, making it the 7th-most populous county in the state and 21st most populous nationally. The county seat is Oakland. Alameda County is in the San Francisco Bay Area, occupying much of the East Bay region.

The Spanish word alameda means either "a grove of poplars...or a tree lined street."  The name was originally used to describe the Arroyo de la Alameda.  The willow and sycamore trees along the banks of the river reminded the early Spanish explorers of a road lined with trees. Although a strict translation to English might be "Poplar Grove Creek," the name of the principal stream that flows through the county is now simply "Alameda Creek."

Alameda County is part of the San Francisco–Oakland–Berkeley, CA Metropolitan Statistical Area, and the San Jose–San Francisco–Oakland, CA Combined Statistical Area.

History 
The county was formed on March 25, 1853, from a large portion of Contra Costa County and a smaller portion of Santa Clara County.

The county seat at the time of the county's formation was located at Alvarado, now part of Union City.  In 1856, it was moved to San Leandro, where the county courthouse was destroyed by the devastating 1868 quake on the Hayward Fault. The county seat was then re-established in the town of Brooklyn from 1872 to 1875. Brooklyn is now part of Oakland, which has been the county seat since 1873.

Much of what is now an intensively urban region was initially developed as a trolley car suburb of San Francisco in the late 19th and early 20th centuries. The historical progression from Native American tribal lands to Spanish then Mexican ranches, then to farms, ranches, and orchards, then to multiple city centers and suburbs, is shared with the adjacent and closely associated Contra Costa County.

Events 
The annual county fair is held at the Alameda County Fairgrounds in Pleasanton. The fair runs for four weekends from June to July. Attractions include horse racing, carnival rides, 4-H exhibits, and live bands.

Geography and climate

The San Francisco Bay borders the county on the west.

The crest of the Berkeley Hills form part of the northeastern boundary and reach into the center of the county. A coastal plain several miles wide lines the bay; and is Oakland's most populous region. Livermore Valley lies in the eastern part of the county. Amador Valley abuts the western edge of Livermore Valley and continues west to the Pleasanton Ridge. The ridges and valleys of the Diablo Range, containing the county's highest peaks, cover the very sparsely populated southeast portion of the county.

The Hayward Fault, a major branch of the San Andreas Fault to the west, runs through the most populated parts of Alameda County, while the Calaveras Fault runs through the southeastern part of the county.

The areas near the Bay itself have a maritime warm-summer Mediterranean climate, whereas behind the mountains, summers are significantly warmer. The climate charts below are for Oakland and inland Livermore.

Neighboring counties
The City and County of San Francisco, California, borders the county on the west, and has a small land border with the city of Alameda, California due to land filling.

Santa Clara County borders the county on the south.

San Joaquin County borders the county on the east.

Contra Costa County borders the county on the north.

National protected area
 Don Edwards San Francisco Bay National Wildlife Refuge (part)

Demographics

2020 census

Note: the US Census treats Hispanic/Latino as an ethnic category. This table excludes Latinos from the racial categories and assigns them to a separate category. Hispanics/Latinos can be of any race.

2014
A 2014 analysis by The Atlantic found Alameda County to be the fourth most racially diverse county in the United States, in terms of closest to equal representation of each racial and ethnic group,—behind Aleutians West Census Area and Aleutians East Borough in Alaska, and Queens County in New York—as well as the most diverse county in California. The 2020 census shows Alameda as having one of the highest Asian percentages and being the only county in the continental US, along with neighboring Santa Clara County, California, to have an Asian plurality - consisting largely of Chinese, Indian and Filipino ancestry.

2011

Places by population, race, and income

2010
The 2010 United States Census reported that Alameda County had a population of 1,510,271. The racial makeup of Alameda County was 649,122 (43.0%) White, 190,451 (12.6%) African American, 9,799 (0.6%) Native American, 394,560 (26.1%) Asian (9.7% Chinese, 5.5% Filipino, 4.8% Indian, 2.0% Vietnamese, 1.2% Korean, 0.8% Japanese, 2.2% Other Asian), 12,802 (0.8%) Pacific Islander, 162,540 (10.8%) from other races, and 90,997 (6.0%) from two or more races. Hispanic or Latino of any race were 339,889 persons (22.5%): 16.4% Mexican, 0.8% Puerto Rican, 0.2% Cuban, 5.1% Other Hispanic.

2000
As of the census of 2000, there were 1,443,741 people, 523,366 households, out of which 32.6% had children under the age of 18 living within them, 47.0% married couples living together, 13.0% had a female householder with no husband present, and 35.2% were non-families. 26.0% of all households were made up of individuals, and 7.3% had someone living alone who was 65 years of age or older.  The average household size was 2.71 and the average family size was 3.31.

In the county, the population was spread out, with 24.6% under the age of 18, 9.6% from 18 to 24, 33.9% from 25 to 44, 21.7% from 45 to 64, and 10.2% who were 65 years of age or older.  The median age was 34 years. For every 100 females there were 96.60 males.  For every 100 females age 18 and over, there were 94.00 males.

The median income for a household in the county was $55,946, and the median income for a family was $65,857 (these figures had risen to $66,430 and $81,341 respectively as of a 2007 estimate). Males had a median income of $47,425 versus $36,921 for females. The per capita income for the county was $26,680.  About 7.7% of families and 11.0% of the population were below the poverty line, including 13.5% of those under age 18 and 8.1% of those age 65 or over.

In 2000, the largest denominational group was the Catholics (with 306,437 adherents) . The largest religious bodies were the Catholic Church (with 306,437 members) and Judaism (with 32,500 members).

2019 United States Census Bureau American Community Survey estimates

According to 2019 US Census Bureau estimates, Alameda County's population was 38.8% White (30.4% Non-Hispanic White and 8.4% Hispanic White), 10.7% Black or African American, 31.1% Asian, 11.5% Some Other Race, 0.8% Native American and Alaskan Native, 0.8% Pacific Islander and 6.4% from two or more races.

The White population continues to remain the largest racial category in Alameda County and includes the 37.7% of Hispanics who self-identify as White. The remainder of Hispanics self-identify as Other Race (49.2%), Multiracial (8.7%), American Indian and Alaskan Native (1.9%), Black (1.5%), Asian (0.9%), and Hawaiian and Pacific Islander (0.2%).

The Black population continues to decline and at 10.7% (including Black Hispanics) is below the national average of 12.8% (including Black Hispanics).  The Black population peaked in the 1980 Census at 18.4%. Alameda county has the 2nd highest percentage of Black residents in California after Solano County at 13.4%.

If Hispanics are treated as a separate category from race, Alameda County's population was 30.4% White, 30.9% Asian, 22.3% Hispanic-Latino, 10.3% Black or African American, 0.5% Some Other Race, 0.3% Native American and Alaskan Native, 0.8% Pacific Islander and 4.4% from two or more races.

Asian Americans are now the largest racial/ethnic group at 30.9% (excluding Asian Hispanics).

White Non-Hispanic Americans are the largest minority group at 30.4% of the population.

By ethnicity, 22.3% of the total population is Hispanic-Latino (of any race) and 77.7% is Non-Hispanic (of any race). If treated as a category separate from race, Hispanics are the third largest minority group in Alameda County.

The largest ancestry group of Hispanics in Alameda County (2018) are of Mexican descent (72.9% of Hispanics) followed by Salvadoran descent (5.5% of Hispanics), Guatemalan descent (3.9%), Puerto Rican descent (3.4%), Spaniard descent (2.0%), Nicaraguan descent (1.7%), Peruvian descent (1.4%), Cuban descent (1.2%), Colombian descent (1.1%), and those of other Hispanic ethnicity or of mixed Hispanic ethnicity (6.9%).

Law, government and politics

Government

The Government of Alameda County is defined and authorized under the California Constitution, California law, and the Charter of the County of Alameda. Much of the Government of California is in practice the responsibility of county governments such as the Government of Alameda County, while municipalities such as the City of Oakland and the City of Berkeley provide additional, often non-essential services. The County government provides countywide services such as elections and voter registration, law enforcement, jails, vital records, property records, tax collection, and public health. In addition it is the local government for all unincorporated areas, and provides services such as law enforcement to some incorporated cities under a contract arrangement.

It is composed of the elected five-member Alameda County Board of Supervisors (BOS) as the county legislature, several other elected offices and officers including the Sheriff, the District Attorney, Assessor, Auditor-Controller/County Clerk/Recorder, Treasurer/Tax Collector, and numerous county departments and entities under the supervision of the County Administrator. In addition, several entities of the government of California have jurisdiction conterminous with Alameda County, such as the Alameda County Superior Court.

The current supervisors are:
 David Haubert, district 1,
 Richard Valle, district 2,
 Dave Brown, district 3,
 Nate Miley, district 4, and
 Keith Carson, district 5.

The Board elects a president who presides at all meetings of the Board and appoints committees to handle work involving the major programs of the county. If the president is absent for a meeting, the vice president shall be responsible. A Board election occurs every two years for these positions. Supervisor Carson is serving currently as president; Supervisor Miley is vice president.

The county's law enforcement is overseen by an elected Sheriff/Coroner and an elected District Attorney. The Sheriff supervises the deputies of the Alameda County Sheriff's Office, whose primary responsibilities include policing unincorporated areas of the county and cities within the county which contract with the Sheriff's Office for police services; providing security and law enforcement for county buildings including courthouses, the county jail and other county properties; providing support resources, such as a forensics laboratory and search and rescue capabilities, to other law enforcement agencies throughout the county; and serving the process of the county's Superior Court system. The District Attorney's office is responsible for prosecuting all criminal violations of the laws of the state of California, the county, or its constituent municipalities, in the Alameda County Superior Court. The current Sheriff is Gregory J. Ahern, who was elected in 2006, succeeding Charles Plummer, who had served in the post for 20 years.  The Sheriff's Office operates two jails: Santa Rita Jail in Dublin, and Glenn E. Dyer Detention Facility in downtown Oakland.

In 2009, Nancy E. O'Malley was appointed Alameda County district attorney after Tom Orloff retired. She won re-election twice. She will not run for re-election in 2022.

The Alameda County Fire Department (ACFD) was formed on July 1, 1993, as a dependent district, with the Board of Supervisors as its governing body. Municipal and specialized fire departments have been consolidated into the ACFD over the years. 1993 brought in the Castro Valley and Eden Consolidated FD, and the County Fire Patrol. San Leandro joined in 1995, Dublin in 1997, Lawrence Berkeley National Laboratory in 2002, Lawrence Livermore National Laboratory in 2007, The Alameda County Regional Emergency Communications Center in 2008, and Newark and Union City in 2010. Emeryville joined the ACFD in 2012.

The Alameda County Water District is a special district within Alameda County created to distribute water, but it is not operated by Alameda County administrators. It is operated by an elected board of directors.

Alameda County Superior Court operates in twelve separate locations throughout the county, with its central René C. Davidson Courthouse located in Oakland near Lake Merritt.  Most major criminal trials and complex civil cases are heard at this location or in courtrooms within the County Administration Building across the street.

State and federal representation

In the California State Assembly, Alameda County is split between five districts:
 ,
 ,
 ,
 , and
 .

In the California State Senate, the county is split between three districts:
 ,
 , and
 .

In the United States House of Representatives, the county is split between four districts:
 ,
 ,
  and 
 .

Politics
Since 1932, Alameda County has been a stronghold of the Democratic Party, with Dwight Eisenhower being the only Republican presidential nominee to have carried the county since. Prior to 1932, the county had been a Republican stronghold. Piedmont resident William F. Knowland was the Republican U.S. Senate Leader from 1953 to 1959. Even when Ronald Reagan won the national popular vote by an 18.3% margin in 1984, Walter Mondale won Alameda County by a  larger margin. In 2004 it voted for John Kerry, who won  over 75% of the vote. Every city and town voted Democratic. George W Bush in 2004 was the last Republican to break 20% of the county's vote, his father (George H.W. Bush) in 1988 was the last to break 30% of the vote, and Ronald Reagan in 1984 was the last to break 40% of the vote (carrying 40.01%).

 

 

The California Secretary of State, as of February 2019, reports that there are 883,942 registered voters in Alameda County.  489,759 (55.4%) are registered Democrats, 95,587 (10.8%) are registered Republicans, 36,649 (4.1%) are registered to minor political parties, and 261,947 (29.6%) declined to answer. Every city, town, and unincorporated area in Alameda County has more registered Democrats than Republicans.

On November 4, 2008, Alameda County voted 61.92% against Proposition 8, which won statewide, and which amended the California Constitution to ban same-sex marriage. The county garnered the sixth highest "no" vote, by percentage, of all California counties, and was the second largest county, by total voter turnout, to vote against it.

Voter registration statistics

Cities by population and voter registration

Crime 

The following table includes the number of incidents reported and the rate per 1,000 persons for each type of offense.

Cities by population and crime rates

Education
The Alameda County Office of Education oversees seventeen K–12 school districts and one K–8 district in Alameda County. In all, there are approximately 10,000 teachers serving 225,000 students.  The ACOE also services three community college districts with a total enrollment of approximately 55,000 students.

The Alameda County Library operates libraries in the cities of Albany, Dublin, Fremont, Newark and Union City and the unincorporated communities of Castro Valley and San Lorenzo. The cities of Alameda, Berkeley, Hayward, Livermore, Oakland, San Leandro, and Pleasanton have their own library systems.

Colleges and universities
Alameda County is home to the University of California, Berkeley, the flagship campus of the University of California system, and one of the largest and most prestigious research universities in the world.

Other colleges and universities located within Alameda county include:
 Berkeley City College
 California State University, East Bay, one of the campuses of the California State University system
 Chabot College, a two-year community college, part of the Chabot-Las Positas Community College District
 College of Alameda, a two-year community college, part of the Peralta Community College District of northern Alameda County
 SAE Expression College, a for-profit school specializing in the entertainment industry
 Graduate Theological Union, a consortium of several Bay Area seminaries, affiliated with the University of California, Berkeley.
 Holy Names University
 Laney College, a two-year community college, part of the Peralta Community College system
 Las Positas College
 Merritt College, a two-year community college, part of the Peralta Community College system
 Mills College, a private 4 year women's college and coeducational graduate school
 Ohlone College, part of the Ohlone Community College District
 Samuel Merritt University

Public schools
School districts

K–12 unified school districts:

 Alameda Unified School District
 Albany Unified School District
 Berkeley Unified School District
 Castro Valley Unified School District
 Dublin Unified School District
 Emery Unified School District
 Fremont Unified School District
 Hayward Unified School District
 Livermore Valley Joint Unified School District
 New Haven Unified School District
 Newark Unified School District
 Oakland Unified School District
 Piedmont Unified School District
 Pleasanton Unified School District
 San Leandro Unified School District
 San Lorenzo Unified School District
 Sunol Glen Unified School District

Others:
 Lammersville Joint Unified School District (high)
 Mountain House Elementary School District (elementary)

 State-operated schools
 California School for the Blind
 California School for the Deaf, Riverside

Arts
The Alameda County Arts Commission, a division of the county administration, under the California Arts Council, was created in 1965. Its fifteen appointed members act in an advisory capacity to the board of supervisors, in promoting the arts. The Oakland Museum of California has a substantial collection of California art works and historical artifacts.

Sports
The following sports teams play in Alameda County:

Parks and recreation 
There are more than 350 parks located within the county. The East Bay Regional Park District operates within Alameda and neighboring Contra Costa County, with numerous parks within the county, including Tilden Regional Park, Redwood Regional Park, Anthony Chabot Regional Park, Coyote Hills Regional Park, Ardenwood Historic Farm, Pleasanton Ridge Regional Park and Vargas Plateau Regional Park. Eastshore State Park is located partially along the bay shore of northern Alameda County. The San Francisco Bay Trail, a project of the Association of Bay Area Governments, will run along the bay shore of the county. The Hayward Area Recreation and Park District is the largest special park district in California.

Transportation

Major highways

  Interstate 80 (Eastshore Freeway)
  Interstate 205 (Robert T. Monagan Freeway)
  Interstate 238
  Interstate 580 (MacArthur Freeway/Arthur Breed Freeway)
  Interstate 680 (Sinclair Freeway)
  Interstate 880 (Nimitz Freeway/Cypress Freeway)
  Interstate 980 (John B. Williams Freeway)
  State Route 13 (Warren Freeway/Tunnel Road/Ashby Avenue)
  State Route 24 (William Byron Rumford Freeway)
  State Route 61
  State Route 77
  State Route 84
  State Route 92 (Jackson Street/San Mateo Bridge)
  State Route 123 (San Pablo Avenue) – formerly  U.S. Route 40
  State Route 185 (Mission Boulevard/East 14th Street)
  State Route 238 (Mission Boulevard/Foothill Boulevard)
  State Route 262 (Mission Boulevard)

Mass transit

Rail
 Altamont Corridor Express (ACE) – commuter rail using existing railroad tracks; primarily brings commuters from San Joaquin County to Santa Clara County
 Amtrak
 California Zephyr – intercity train route running between Emeryville and Chicago.
 Capitol Corridor – commuter rail using existing railroad tracks, extending from San Jose to Sacramento, running through western Alameda County
 Coast Starlight – intercity train route running between Los Angeles and Seattle via Oakland and Emeryville
 San Joaquins – Amtrak route between Oakland and Bakersfield through Fresno and the Central Valley
 Bay Area Rapid Transit (BART) – rapid transit commuter rail centered on northwest Oakland, primarily serving commuters to downtown San Francisco and downtown Oakland
 Valley Link – planned commuter rail running between the Tri-Valley and San Joaquin County (expected to commence in 2028)

Bus
 AC Transit – local bus system in western Alameda County and west Contra Costa County, with additional service across the three bridges from Alameda County to downtown San Francisco, San Mateo, and Palo Alto
 WHEELS – bus system in the cities of southeastern Alameda County
 Union City Transit – local city bus service within Union City in addition to AC Transit
 Emery-Go-Round – free bus service in Emeryville
 Dumbarton Express – additional service across the Dumbarton Bridge between Fremont and Palo Alto
 Santa Clara Valley Transportation Authority (VTA) – commuter service between southern Alameda county and job centers in the Silicon Valley

Ferry
 Alameda / Oakland Ferry and Harbor Bay Ferry – connect Oakland, Alameda, and Bay Farm Island with downtown San Francisco

Airports
The main airport is the Oakland International Airport, with two general aviation airports, the Hayward Executive Airport and Livermore Municipal Airport.

Services
Alameda Health System operates the public health system in Alameda County. It operates five hospitals (Alameda Hospital, Fairmont Hospital, Highland Hospital, John George Psychiatric Hospital, and San Leandro Hospital), and four primary care medical clinics (called ambulatory wellness centers) within the county.

The Alameda County Community Food Bank nonprofit provides food bank resources to residents. The Family Emergency Shelter Coalition coordinates services for homeless families.

Landmarks 
Alameda County has eight National Historic Landmarks: The Abbey, Joaquin Miller House, First Church of Christ, Scientist, USS Hornet (CVS-12) (aircraft carrier), Lake Merritt Wild Duck Refuge, Lightship WAL-605, Relief, Paramount Theatre, Potomac (Presidential yacht), and Room 307, Gilman Hall, University of California. The county has a large number of National Historic Places, as well as a number of California Historical Landmarks.

Sister county
Alameda has a sister county: Taoyuan County, Taiwan (now Taoyuan City).

Communities

Cities

 Alameda
 Albany
 Berkeley
 Dublin
 Emeryville
 Fremont
 Hayward
 Livermore
 Newark
 Oakland (county seat)
 Piedmont
 Pleasanton
 San Leandro
 Union City

Census-designated places
 Ashland
 Castro Valley
 Cherryland
 Fairview
 San Lorenzo
 Sunol

Unincorporated communities

 Altamont
 Brightside
 Carpenter
 Dougherty
 Dresser
 East Pleasanton
 Hayward Acres
 Kilkare Woods
 Komandorski Village
 Mendenhall Springs
 Midway
 Mountain House
 Mowry Landing
 San Ramon Village
 Scotts Corner
 Verona

Former townships 

 Oakland Township – the northern portion subsequently became the cities of Berkeley and Albany.
 Alameda Township – now essentially coterminous with the City of Alameda.
 Brooklyn Township – mostly contained within Oakland and Piedmont.
 Eden Township – partly incorporated into San Leandro and Hayward, the rest contains the communities of Castro Valley, San Lorenzo, and other unincorporated areas.
 Washington Township – contains Union City, Newark, Fremont, and small unincorporated areas nearby.
 Murray Township — Contains cities of Dublin, Pleasanton, and Livermore, and substantial unincorporated areas including Sunol.

Population ranking

The population ranking of the following table is based on the 2020 census of Alameda County.

† county seat

See also
 USS Alameda County (LST-32), the only US Naval vessel named after the county
 National Register of Historic Places listings in Alameda County, California
 Solar power in Alameda County
List of counties in California

Notes

People 

Natalie Gregory  Former Child Star Actress First Sister
 Sharee Gregory Actress and Sister of Natalie Gregory

References

External links

 
 map of Alameda County with supervisorial district boundaries
 Alameda County Fairgrounds – Annual county fair June to July
 A short film about Alameda County from 1958
 Alameda County Fire Department
 Alameda County Fire Department Training Division
 Hiking trails in Alameda County, at the Berkeley Wiki website

 
California counties
Counties in the San Francisco Bay Area
1853 establishments in California
Populated places established in 1853
Majority-minority counties in California